Polarized pluralism is a two-party or multi-party political system which is seen as overly polarized and therefore as dysfunctional. It was originally described by political philosopher Giovanni Sartori to define a system where moderate views are replaced by polarized views. The phrase was used by analyst Roger Cohen writing in the New York Times to describe American politics about energy, but the phrase is not widely used in mainstream newspapers.

In a typical two-party or multi-party system, the distribution of party power looks like a normal curve with a slight skew. In such a condition, most of the country is moderate or moderate-leaning left-wing or right-wing. If the country becomes polarized, then the curve becomes one with two main humps and looks like a bimodal distribution, with the power at the far political left and right ends, and a severe dip in the middle; one side will have more influence than the other, creating a strong trend to follow them. There is speculation that a nation with such a distribution, effectively having two highly separate approaches with no compromise positions in the middle, becomes difficult to govern.

An example of polarized pluralism was politics during Weimar-era Germany. The nation had two power centers, highly split apart; the communists and the Nazis. The Nazis were the stronger of the two parties and won total control of the government, and led to a condition of fascism.

References

Political science terminology
Pluralism (philosophy)